Zebrida brevicarinata is a species of decapod in the family Pilumnidae.

References

Further reading

 

Decapods
Articles created by Qbugbot
Crustaceans described in 1999